Recoules-d'Aubrac is a commune in the Lozère department of southern France.

See also

Communes of the Lozère department

References

Recoulesdaubrac